MWSA may refer to: 

Military Writers Society of America
Minnesota Woman Suffrage Association
Massachusetts Woman Suffrage Association